Raisa O'Farrill Bolanos  (born 17 April 1972) was a Cuban female volleyball player.

She was part of the Cuba women's national volleyball team winning the gold medal at both the 1992 Summer Olympics and 1996 Summer Olympics. She also played at the 1994 FIVB Volleyball Women's World Championship in Brazil. On club level she played with Villa Clara.

Clubs
 Villa Clara (1994)

References

Further reading 
 Sports Reference Profile
Women Volleyball XII World Championship 1994 São Paulo

External links
Raisa Ofarrill at Sports Reference
http://www.encyclopedia.com/women/dictionaries-thesauruses-pictures-and-press-releases/ofarrill-raisa-1972

1972 births
Living people
Cuban women's volleyball players
Cuban sportswomen
Place of birth missing (living people)
Olympic volleyball players of Cuba
Volleyball players at the 1996 Summer Olympics
Volleyball players at the 1992 Summer Olympics
Olympic medalists in volleyball
Olympic gold medalists for Cuba
Medalists at the 1996 Summer Olympics
Medalists at the 1992 Summer Olympics